Linda Martini are a Portuguese rock band based in Lisbon, formed in 2003. Originally a five-piece, the band was founded by André Henriques (guitar, vocals), Pedro Geraldes (guitar), Sérgio Lemos (guitar), Claúdia Guerreiro (bass) and Hélio Morais (drums). The band recently added Rui Carvalho as a full time fourth member after a brief period acting as a trio.

Linda Martini are one of the most successful bands in the Portuguese alternative rock scene, having played in all major Portuguese music festivals and achieved two number-ones in the Portuguese album charts with the  albums Sirumba and Linda Martini.

Members 
Current members

 André Henriques – vocals, guitar (2003–present)
 Cláudia Guerreiro – bass (2003–present)
 Hélio Morais – drums (2003–present)
 Rui Carvalho –  guitar (2022–present)

Past members

 Pedro Geraldes – guitar (2003–2022)

 Sérgio Lemos – guitar (2003–2009)

Discography

Studio albums

Extended plays 

 Linda Martini (2006)
 Marsupial (2008)
 Intervalo (2009)

Compilations 

 Baú (2014)

References

External links 
 

Musical groups established in 2003
Portuguese rock music groups
Portuguese indie rock groups
Portuguese noise rock groups
Post-hardcore groups
Portuguese alternative rock groups
2003 establishments in Portugal
Musical quartets